Aksana Sivitskaya (born 4 August 1974) is a Paralympic athlete from Belarus competing mainly in category T12 sprint and F12 long jump events.

Aksana competed in the 2000, 2004 and 2008 Summer Paralympics in both the 100m and long jump. She never won a medal in the 100m but did win a silver in the long jump in 2000 and a bronze in 2004.

At the 2012 Summer Paralympics she rowed in the mixed coxed four.

References

External links
 

1974 births
Living people
Paralympic athletes of Belarus
Paralympic rowers of Belarus
Athletes (track and field) at the 2000 Summer Paralympics
Athletes (track and field) at the 2004 Summer Paralympics
Paralympic silver medalists for Belarus
Paralympic bronze medalists for Belarus
Medalists at the 2000 Summer Paralympics
Medalists at the 2004 Summer Paralympics
Rowers at the 2012 Summer Paralympics
Place of birth missing (living people)
Paralympic medalists in athletics (track and field)
Belarusian female sprinters
Belarusian female long jumpers
Belarusian female rowers
Visually impaired sprinters
Visually impaired long jumpers
Paralympic sprinters
Paralympic long jumpers
Belarusian people with disabilities
Blind people